

The Top 30 (also known previously as the BRT Top 30 and today as both the Radio 2 Top 30 and the VRT Top 30) is a Belgian weekly music record chart compiled by the Vlaamse Radio- en Televisieomroeporganisatie (VRT) network and broadcast every Saturday on its station Radio 2. It debuted on 2 May 1970, with "Spirit in the Sky" by Norman Greenbaum as its first number-one song.

It was the pre-eminent music industry standard chart for Flanders (the Dutch-speaking part of Belgium) until January 1995, when the Ultratop 50 was established. However, the Top 30 continues to be compiled to the present day, and as such has become the longest-running music chart in Belgium.

Top 30 records

Most singles in the Top 30 
 Madonna: 52
 Will Tura: 47
 Michael Jackson: 46
 Queen: 40
 Prince: 33
 Cliff Richard: 32
 Clouseau: 32
 Rod Stewart: 31
 Tina Turner: 29
 Kylie Minogue: 29
 U2: 28
 Elton John: 27
 Whitney Houston: 27
 ABBA: 26
 Bee Gees: 25
 Paul McCartney: 25
 Rolling Stones: 25
 David Bowie: 25

 Most weeks spent in the Top 30
 Madonna: 497
 Michael Jackson: 423
 Will Tura: 346
 Clouseau: 320
 Natalia: 316
 K3: 305
 Marco Borsato: 292
 Celine Dion: 282
 ABBA: 280
 Belle Perez: 266
 Kylie Minogue: 250
 Queen: 249
 Shakira: 239
 Britney Spears: 231
 Tina Turner: 221
 Robbie Williams: 219
 Elton John: 213
 Whitney Houston: 211
 Willy Sommers: 205
 Phil Collins: 202
 Rod Stewart: 201
 Mika: 200

See also
List of number-one hits (Belgium)
Ultratop 50

References

External links
 Top 30

Belgian record charts
Music chart shows